William Emard (born 17 March 2000) is a Canadian artistic gymnast. At the 2021 World Championships, he finished eighth in the all-around final,  marking the best result for a Canadian male gymnast in World Championship history. Additionally, he won gold in the vault event of the Mersin event in the 2021 FIG Artistic Gymnastics World Cup series.

Career
Emard joined the senior Canadian team in 2018. However, his early career was met with adversity in injury form. At the 2018 Pacific Rim Gymnastics Championships he injured himself during warm up and then spent several months in recovery for a knee injury and a labrum tear in the shoulder.

His first International success  came in the 2021 FIG Artistic Gymnastics World Cup series where he competed at Koper and Mersin. In Koper he claimed the silver on floor exercise and in Mersin he won bronze of floor exercise, silver on rings, and gold on vault. In October he competed at the 2021 World Artistic Gymnastics Championships, qualifying 11th in the all-around, 6th on rings, and 8th on vault. He placed 8th in
the all-around final and 7th on rings.

Competitive history

References

External links 
 

2000 births
Living people
Canadian male artistic gymnasts
Sportspeople from Laval, Quebec
21st-century Canadian people